Edward Charles Thompson (1 April 1851 – 20 January 1933) was an Irish nationalist politician and Member of Parliament (MP) in the House of Commons of the United Kingdom of Great Britain and Ireland.

He was elected unopposed as the Irish Parliamentary Party MP for the North Monaghan constituency at the 1900 by-election, which was caused by the death of Daniel MacAleese. He did not contest the 1906 general election.

External links

 

1851 births
1933 deaths
Irish Parliamentary Party MPs
Members of the Parliament of the United Kingdom for County Monaghan constituencies (1801–1922)
UK MPs 1900–1906
People from County Monaghan